Cube Rock is a small rock lying in the southern entrance to Antarctic Sound,  southeast of Cape Scrymgeour, Andersson Island, off the Trinity Peninsula. The name is a translation of Roca Cubo, a descriptive name appearing on an Argentine chart of 1960.

References 

Rock formations of the Trinity Peninsula